The North American Religious Liberty Association (NARLA) is a regional chapter of the International Religious Liberty Association (IRLA). The IRLA was founded in 1893 and now has over 50 national and regional chapters around the world. 

NARLA is the rebirth of the American Religious Liberty Association (ARLA) formed in the late 19th century by the Seventh-day Adventist Church.

NARLA's focus is on matters pertaining to freedom of conscience. This includes supporting a broad interpretation of the First Amendment's guarantee of free exercise of religion and laws protecting religious freedom, supporting laws to advance religious liberty, and supporting the principle that religion must not be co-opted by the state through regulation or through financial entanglements.

Additionally, NARLA is associated with Liberty Magazine, a publication with a circulation of roughly 200,000, and with the radio broadcasts Freedom's Ring which is syndicated across the U.S., and Talking About Freedom, which is broadcast in the Washington, D.C., region.

Melissa Reid is the Executive Director of NARLA.

In addition to its lobbying efforts, NARLA and Liberty Magazine host an annual non-partisan dinner in Washington DC.  Past speakers from include Senator Rick Santorum (2004), Senator Hillary Clinton (2005), and Senator John McCain (2006).

See also
 Liberty (Adventist magazine)
 International Religious Liberty Association
 Religious freedom
 Seventh-day Adventist Church

External links
Official site
North American Religious Liberty Association - West Region
Liberty Magazine

Civil liberties advocacy groups in the United States
Freedom of religion in the United States
Seventh-day Adventist organizations